The 2014–15 Louisiana Tech Bulldogs basketball team represented Louisiana Tech University during the 2014–15 NCAA Division I men's basketball season. The Bulldogs, led by fourth year head coach Michael White, played their home games at the Thomas Assembly Center and were members of Conference USA. They finished the season 27–9, 15–3 in C-USA play to finish as regular season C-USA champions. They advanced to the semifinals of the C-USA tournament where they lost to UAB. As a regular season conference champion who failed to win their conference tournament, they received an automatic bid to the National Invitation Tournament where they defeated Central Michigan in the first round and Texas A&M in the second round before losing in the quarterfinals to Temple.

Previous season 
The Bulldogs finished the season 29–8, 13–3 in C-USA play to finish in a four way tie for the C-USA regular season championship. They advanced to the championship game of the C-USA tournament where they lost to Tulsa. After tiebreakers, they were the #1 seed in the C-USA Tournament, and as a regular season conference champion and overall #1 seed in their conference tournament who failed to win their conference tournament, they received at automatic bid to the National Invitation Tournament where they defeated Iona and Georgia to advance to the quarterfinals where they lost to Florida State.

Departures

Incoming Transfers

Recruiting class of 2014

Recruiting class of 2015

Roster

Schedule

|-
!colspan=9 style="background:#002F8B; color:#FF0000;"| Non-conference regular season

|-
!colspan=9 style="background:#002F8B; color:#FF0000;"| Conference USA regular season

|-
!colspan=9 style="background:#002F8B; color:#FF0000;"| Conference USA tournament

|-
!colspan=9 style="background:#002F8B; color:#FF0000;"| National Invitation tournament

References

Louisiana Tech Bulldogs basketball seasons
Louisiana Tech
Louisiana Tech
Louisiana Tech Bulldogs men's b
Louisiana Tech Bulldogs men's b